Brigitte Sauriol (born 1945 in Montreal, Quebec) is a Canadian film director and screenwriter. She is most noted for her 1983 film Just a Game (Rien qu'un jeu), for which she received a Genie Award nomination for Best Director at the 5th Genie Awards in 1984.

Her other credits included the films Le Loup blanc, The Absence (L'Absence), Bleue brume and Laura Laur, and an episode of the television series Haute tension. She teaches screenwriting at the Université du Québec à Montréal.

References

External links

1945 births
Canadian women screenwriters
Canadian women film directors
Canadian television directors
Film directors from Montreal
Writers from Montreal
Canadian screenwriters in French
French Quebecers
Living people
Canadian women television directors